Aljoša Žorga (born 25 February 1947) is a former Slovenian basketball player who competed for Yugoslavia in the 1968 Summer Olympics. He was inducted into the Slovenian Athletes Hall of Fame, in 2012.

References

1947 births
Living people
Basketball players at the 1968 Summer Olympics
Olympic basketball players of Yugoslavia
Olympic medalists in basketball
Olympic silver medalists for Yugoslavia
Slovenian men's basketball players
Medalists at the 1968 Summer Olympics
Mediterranean Games gold medalists for Yugoslavia
Competitors at the 1967 Mediterranean Games
FIBA World Championship-winning players
Mediterranean Games medalists in basketball
Yugoslav men's basketball players
1970 FIBA World Championship players